is a Japanese politician and a current member of the House of Councillors for the Kanagawa at-large district in the Diet of Japan. A native of Kawasaki, Kanagawa and graduate of Keio University with a bachelor's degree in Political Science, he has previously served in the assembly of Kanagawa Prefecture for two terms from 1987 to 1993, in the House of Representatives in the Diet for three terms from 1993 to 2003 and as the governor of Kanagawa Prefecture from 2003 until 2011. He was elected to the House of Councillors in 2013 as a member of Your Party. Upon the dissolution of Your Party in November 2014 he joined the Party for Future Generations. He left the party in August 2015 and sat as an independent until becoming the leader of Kibō no Tō in May 2018. He resigned as leader on May 28, 2019, and was succeeded by Nariaki Nakayama. He subsequently left the party and joined Nippon Ishin no Kai.

During his time as a graduate student at the Matsushita School of Government, Matsuzawa lived in Frederick, Maryland for a year and worked in the office of then-U.S. Congresswoman Beverly Byron, studying the 1984 U.S. presidential election, which became the subject of a book he wrote and published in Japan in 1985.

He was affiliated with the openly nationalist organisation Nippon Kaigi.

References

External links 
  

1958 births
Living people
Governors of Kanagawa Prefecture
Keio University alumni
Members of the House of Representatives (Japan)
Members of the House of Councillors (Japan)
Members of the Kanagawa Prefectural Assembly
Your Party politicians
People from Kawasaki, Kanagawa
United States congressional aides
Tokyo gubernatorial candidates
Nippon Ishin no Kai politicians
21st-century Japanese politicians

Members of Nippon Kaigi